Eubotrys recurva is a plant species native to the eastern United States. Common names include deciduous mountain fetterbush and red-twig doghobble.

Distribution and Habitat
The plant grows in moist forests, bogs, granitic domes, etc., at elevations up to 1500 m (5000 feet). It has been reported from Alabama, Georgia, North and South Carolina, Tennessee, Kentucky, Ohio, Virginia, West Virginia and New York State.

Description
Eubotrys recurva is a branching shrub up to 4 m (13 feet) tall. Leaves are up to 8 cm (3.2 in) long. Flowers are campanulate, white to pale pink. Fruit is a dry capsule.

References

Vaccinioideae
Flora of the Northeastern United States
Flora of the Southeastern United States
Flora of the Appalachian Mountains
Flora without expected TNC conservation status